Trendy Man is Taiwanese Mandopop artist Show Lo's sixth Mandarin studio album. It was released on 26 December 2008 by Gold Typhoon (Taiwan). It is the first release after Show's continuation of contract with them, formerly EMI Music Taiwan.

Two preorder limited editions were available: Trendy Man (Mirror Limited Preorder Edition) (潮男正傳 潮男幻鏡珍藏版) and Trendy Man (Box Limited Preorder Edition) (潮男正傳 潮男誌盒裝版), which includes gifts. A further edition was released, Trendy Man (Waist Support Celebration Edition) (2CD) (潮男正傳 撐腰相挺慶功2CD版) containing a bonus CD with a new song "為你寫首歌" (Song Written for You).

Album
 The first lead track "箇中強手" (Best Of The Bunch - HOT SHOT) is a high-tempo dance track, and is the opening theme song of Taiwanese drama, Hot Shot (籃球火), starring Show, Jerry Yan and Wu Chun.
 "搞笑" (Making Jokes) a ballad is the second lead track, with the music video featuring Alice Tzeng.
 The third lead track, "撐腰" (Waist Support) is an upbeat fun dance track. The music video features guest appearance by Party Boys, Barbie Shu, Dee Shu, Jolin Tsai, Blackie/Hei Ren, Da Mu, Hu Gua, Jacky Wu, Chai Zhi Ping, Lin He Long and Luo Ma Ma
 "幸福不滅" (Cause I Believe) a piano ballad is an insert song of Hot Shot (籃球火).

Reception
The album debuted at number one on Taiwan's Top 20 G-Music Weekly Combo and Mandarin Charts, and Five Music Chart at week starting 26 December 2008 to 1 January 2009, with a percentage sales of 32.32%, 37.8%, and 31.54% respectively. It charted continuously in the Mandarin Chart for 19 weeks, the Combo Chart for 13 weeks and the 5 Music Chart for 15 weeks.

The tracks "撐腰" (Waist Support) and "搞笑" (Making Jokes) are listed at number 30 and 61 respectively on Hit Fm Taiwan's Hit Fm Annual Top 100 Singles Chart (Hit-Fm年度百首單曲) for 2009. The track "撐腰" (Waist Support) won one of the Songs of the Year at the 2009 Metro Radio Mandarin Music Awards presented by Hong Kong radio station Metro Info.

According to Taiwan's G-Music chart the album is the second best selling album in Taiwan in 2009. It was also awarded one of the Top 10 Selling Mandarin Albums of the Year award at the 2009 IFPI Hong Kong Album Sales Awards, presented by the Hong Kong branch of IFPI.

Track listing

Music videos

Releases
Four editions were released by Gold Typhoon (Taiwan):
 2 December 2008 - Trendy Man (Mirror Limited Preorder Edition) (CD) (潮男正傳 潮男幻鏡珍藏版) - includes gifts.
 5 December 2008 - Trendy Man (Box Limited Preorder Edition) (CD) (潮男正傳 潮男誌盒裝版) - includes gifts.
 26 December 2008 - Trendy Man (潮男正傳)
 23 January 2009 - Trendy Man (Waist Support Celebration Edition) (2CD) (潮男正傳 撐腰相挺慶功2CD版) - includes a bonus CD with a new song "為你寫首歌" (Song Written for You)

Charts

References

External links
  Show Lo@Gold Typhoon Taiwan

2008 albums
Show Lo albums
Gold Typhoon Taiwan albums